Herman Wohl (1877–1936) was a Jewish–American composer closely associated with the American Yiddish Theatre.

Galicia
Wohl was born in Otyniia near Stanislavov (now called Ivano-Frankivsk) in eastern Galicia, now Ukraine. He was raised in a Chasidic home and studied with cantors from the age of 9. He soon began composing, directing choirs, and singing as a Hazzan himself. At the age of 16 he joined Kalman Juvelier's troupe in Galicia, acting, singing in the chorus, and writing songs for their repertoire.

America
In 1896 he was brought to America to teach; he soon began writing for several theater troupes.

Working with Edelstein in the People's Theater, he composed music to 
 Mikhl Goldberg's musical comedy  (Lived and laughed)
 Adam Mesko's operetta  (The night of love)
 Boris Thomashefsky's  (The holy song)
 Itskhok Lesh's , 1921
 Israel Rozenberg's 
 Tomashevski's Lebedik un freylekh and Thousand and One Nights
 Israel Rozenberg's 

Some of his hundreds of songs, most composed with Arnold Perlmutter, are listed at Florida Atlantic University's website:

  (A little bit of ground) 1911
  (A Child Is The World's Happiness) 1917
  (often translated as Quintessential Jew, regarded as one of the most classic bar-mitzvah songs) 1909
  (If you can't do it and don't know, don't undertake it) 1911
  (You're my little gift) 1907
  (Village Maiden) 1911
  (This is the love of Jacob and Rachel) from Galitsianer khasene
  (A True Jewish Heart) 1906
  (Song Of The Diaspora) 1921
  (The Husband Is The Ruler) 1910
  (Long Live Columbus) 1915
  (My Most Loving Friend Is My Mother) 1921
  (They're Dancing in America) 1908
  (Maiden, You'll Yet Be happy) (with Jennie Goldstein)
  (Second Wife) 1910
  (Women, Make Me President) 1910
  (Everybody is Striking Now) 1919

Besides being a Second Avenue songwriter and composer in the Yiddish Theater District, Wohl continued to work as a synagogue choirmaster and liturgical composer. For many years he conducted the choir for the most widely acclaimed and revered cantor of the time—and probably of all time—Yossele Rosenblatt. His many cantorial-choral compositions for Sabbath, High Holy Days, and Festivals remain in manuscript, and the whereabouts of many of these are not even known. He died in 1936.

References

External links 
 Viktor recordings of Wohl compositions

1877 births
1936 deaths
American opera composers
Male opera composers
American people of Ukrainian-Jewish descent
Jewish American classical composers
Jewish songwriters
Jews from Galicia (Eastern Europe)
Ukrainian Jews
Yiddish theatre
Austro-Hungarian emigrants to the United States